Marie Isabelle (Telghuys) De Keyser (1815–1879) was a Belgian artist known for her painting of genre scenes and History painting. She was born in Verviers and died in Antwerp. De Keyser was taught by Nicaise De Keyser, also an artist, and married him in 1840.

References 

1815 births
1879 deaths
19th-century Belgian women artists
19th-century Belgian painters
Belgian women painters
Belgian genre painters
Belgian history painters